The Grammy Award for Best Americana Performance is an award presented by the Recording Academy to honor quality Americana performances in any given year. The award was presented for the first time on February 5, 2023 at the 65th Annual Grammy Awards.

The Academy announced the new category (as part of the American Roots Music genre field) in June 2022, stating that the award goes to "a track or single performance that recognizes artistic excellence in an Americana recording by a solo artist, collaborating artists, established duo, or established group". The award sits together with other American Roots-themed awards such as Best American Roots Song, Best Americana Album and Best American Roots Performance.

The inaugural recipient and current holder of the award is Bonnie Raitt, who won for her song "Made Up Mind".

Winners and nominees

References 

Grammy Award categories
Americana Performance
Americana